Lycée Galilée is a comprehensive senior high school/sixth-form college  in Gennevilliers, Hauts-de-Seine, France, in the Paris metropolitan area.  the school has about 900 students.

The school has a boarding facility (internat) available.

There is also a plastics industry training programme.

References

External links
 Lycée Galilée 
 BTS Lycée Galilée 

Lycées in Hauts-de-Seine